Twin Lakes is a census-designated place (CDP) in and governed by Adams County, Colorado, United States]. The CDP is a part of the Denver–Aurora–Lakewood, CO Metropolitan Statistical Area. The population of the Twin Lakes CDP was 6,101 at the United States Census 2010. Denver post office 80221 serves the area.

Geography

Demographics

See also

 List of census-designated places in Colorado

References

External links

Adams County website

Census-designated places in Adams County, Colorado
Census-designated places in Colorado
Denver metropolitan area